The Southland Conference baseball tournament is the conference championship tournament in baseball for the Southland Conference. The winner of the tournament receives the conference's automatic bid to the NCAA Division I baseball tournament.

Tournament
The Southland Conference Baseball Tournament is a double-elimination tournament held annually at various locations in the Southland Conference region. Before the departure of five members following the 2021 season, the eight teams with the best conference record at the end of the regular season earned berths in the tournament. Starting in 2022, all conference members will participate in the tournament (unless banned due to NCAA sanctions). The winner receives an automatic bid to the NCAA Division I baseball tournament. Other teams have to hope for an at-large bid.

History
The Southland Conference tournament began in 1964.  From 1964 through 1966 the tournament consisted of three teams.  In 1967 and 1968 the tournament expanded to a four-team double-elimination tournament.  This was all that constituted conference play for those seasons.

From 1969 until 1992, the Southland Conference did not have a baseball tournament.  In some seasons, a championship series was held between division champions.

In 1993, the conference began holding a baseball tournament again.  From 1993 through 1995, the tournament was a four team double-elimination tournament.

In 1996, it expanded to become a six team double-elimination tournament and remained that way until 2007.

In 2008, the tournament once again expanded and became an eight team double-elimination tournament.

In 2012, two brackets of four teams were added in a double-elimination format. The winner of each bracket plays in a championship game. This facilitates a television broadcast of the final.

After five schools left the conference following the 2021 season, the tournament format was changed for 2022. The top two seeds will host double-elimination tournaments that each involve four teams. The winner from each site will advance to a best-of-3 final hosted by the top surviving seed.

Starting in 2023, the event will move to Joe Miller Ballpark on the campus of McNeese State University in Lake Charles, Louisiana, reportedly as part of a deal that kept McNeese in the Southland after it had been courted by Conference USA and nearly joined the Western Athletic Conference. The agreement with McNeese initially runs for four years, with McNeese having the right of first refusal to continue as host after 2026. The future tournament format has not yet been announced.

Champions

By year

 McNeese dropped "State" from its athletic branding after the 2019 season.
 Nicholls dropped "State" from its athletic branding after the 2018 season.

By school
Updated through 2021 Tournament.

Italics indicate that the program is no longer a Southland member.

See also
Southland Conference softball tournament

External links
 2015 Southland Conference Baseball Media Guide

References